Eugène Plisson was a British fencer. He competed in the individual masters foil event at the 1900 Summer Olympics.

References

External links

Year of birth missing
Year of death missing
British male fencers
Olympic fencers of Great Britain
Fencers at the 1900 Summer Olympics
Place of birth missing
Place of death missing